The 1952 Sydney to Hobart Yacht Race, was the eighth annual running of the "blue water classic" Sydney to Hobart Yacht Race.

Hosted by the Cruising Yacht Club of Australia based in Sydney, New South Wales, the 1950 edition began on Sydney Harbour, at noon on Boxing Day (26 December 1952), before heading south for 630 nautical miles (1,170 km) through the Tasman Sea, past Bass Strait, into Storm Bay and up the River Derwent, to cross the finish line in Hobart, Tasmania.

The 1952 Sydney to Hobart Yacht Race comprised a fleet of 17 competitors. The fleet found the going very difficult, and line-honours winner Nocturne, skippered by JR Bull won in the second slowest-ever time of 6 days, 2 hours and 34 minutes. Ingrid, skippered by JS Taylor was awarded handicap honours on adjusted time using the International Measurement System (IMS).

1952 fleet
17 yachts registered to begin the 1952 Sydney to Hobart Yacht race.

Results

References

See also
Sydney to Hobart Yacht Race

Sydney to Hobart Yacht Race
S
1952 in Australian sport
December 1952 sports events in Australia